Run Into You is an upcoming South Korean television series starring Kim Dong-wook and Jin Ki-joo. It depicts the strange and beautiful time travel of two people who gets trapped in the year 1987. It is scheduled to premiere on May 1, 2023 on KBS2, and will air every Monday and Tuesday at 21:50 (KST).

Synopsis
A man, who seeks the truth behind a serial murder in the past, and a woman, who wants to prevent the marriage of her parents, realize that their goals are connected.

Cast

Main
 Kim Dong-wook as Yoon Hae-jun, a news anchor who has a cool and straightforward personality.
 Jin Ki-joo as Baek Yoon-young, an ordinary office worker living in the city.

Supporting
 Seo Ji-hye as Lee Soon-ae (in 1987)
 Lee Won-jeong as Hee-seop (in 1987)
 Kim Jong-soo as Byung-gu
 Lee Gyu-hoe as Hee-seop
 Lim Jong-yoon as Min-su (in 2021)
 Kim Hye-eun as Mi-suk (in 2021)
 Kim Jung-young as Ok-ja
 Choi Young-woo as Dong-sik
 Park Soo-young as Hyung-man
 Lee Ji-hyun as Lee Soon-ae (in 2021)
 Jang Seo-won as Gyo-ryeon
 Jung Ga-hee as Lee Joo-young
 Kim Yeon-woo as Min-su (in 1987)
 Jung Shin-hye as Cheong-ah
 Joo Yeon-woo as Yoo Beom-ryong
 Hong Na-hyun as Kyung-ae
 Kim Ye-ji as Hae-gyeong
 Kang Ji-woon as Yu-ri
 Ji Hye-won as Mi-suk (in 1987)

Production and release
The first script reading of the cast was held in April 2022.

Run Into You was initially scheduled for release in the second half of 2022. In November 2022, it was confirmed that the series would premiere on KBS2's Wednesdays and Thursdays time slot in January 2023. However, on January 6, 2023, KBS announced that the premiere of Run Into You was again pushed back to May 2023 and will air on Mondays and Tuesdays time slot instead.

References

External links

 
 
 

Korean-language television shows
Korean Broadcasting System television dramas
South Korean fantasy television series
South Korean mystery television series
South Korean time travel television series
2023 South Korean television series debuts

Upcoming television series